Alejandro Ruidiaz (born 3 September 1969) is an Argentine former professional footballer who played as a midfielder. He competed at the men's tournament at the 1988 Summer Olympics.

Career
Ruidiaz played at the 1985 FIFA U-16 World Championship and made his debut with Club Atlético Independiente's first team at the age of 17. He was part of the Argentina national team which participated at the 1988 Summer Olympics. In 1989, he competed at the 1989 FIFA U-16 World Championship and joined Japanese side Toshiba S.C. Having returned to Independiente in 1990 he was severely injured in a car crash. He played his last match for the club in December 1991 before being released.

In September 1992, he was close to a move to River Plate but during examinations related to a knee injury he was diagnosed with a heart problem which forced him to retire from playing aged 23.

References

Living people
1969 births
Sportspeople from Avellaneda
Association football midfielders
Argentine footballers
Argentine Primera División players
Club Atlético Independiente footballers
Hokkaido Consadole Sapporo players
Argentina international footballers
Olympic footballers of Argentina
Footballers at the 1988 Summer Olympics